The 2006–07 New Orleans/Oklahoma City Hornets season was the team's 5th in the NBA. The Hornets split their games between the New Orleans Arena and the Ford Center, playing the majority of their schedule in Oklahoma City as they had in the previous season. The Hornets improved by one win, finishing 39-43, but failed to reach the playoffs.

Although the Hornets moved back to New Orleans full-time for the 2007-2008 NBA season, Oklahoma City was not without basketball for long as the Seattle SuperSonics relocated to Oklahoma for the 2008-09 campaign and became known as the Oklahoma City Thunder.

Draft picks

Roster

Roster Notes
 Small forward Peja Stojaković played 13 games (his last game being on November 24, 2006) but missed the rest of the season after dealing with back spasms and undergoing surgery to remove a disc fragment in his lower back.

Regular season

Season standings

Record vs. opponents

Game log

|- style="background:#cfc;"
| 1
| November 1
| @ Boston 
| 91–87
| Chris Paul (20)
| Tyson Chandler (9)
| Chris Paul (10)
| TD Banknorth Garden  18,624
| 1–0
|- style="background:#cfc;"
| 2
| November 3
| @ Indiana 
| 100–91
| David West (20)
| Tyson Chandler (15)
| Chris Paul (6)
| Conseco Fieldhouse18,165
| 2–0
|- style="background:#cfc;
| 3
| November 5
| Houston 
| 96–90
| David West (22)
| Tyson Chandler (11)
| Chris Paul (16)
| New Orleans Arena 18,202
| 3–0
|- style="background:#cfc;"
| 4
| November 7
| Golden State 
| 97–93
| Chris Paul (22)
| Tyson Chandler (14)
| Chris Paul (11)
| Ford Center  19,164
| 4–0
|- style="background:#fcc;"
| 5
| November 9
| @ Golden State
| 116–121
| Chris Paul (34)
| Tyson Chandler (11)
| Chris Paul (16)
| Oracle Arena  16,927
| 4–1
|- style="background:#fcc;"
| 6
| November 10
| @ Portland
| 91–92
| Peja Stojaković (21)
| David West (13)
| Chris Paul (8)
| Rose Garden Arena  14,122
| 4–2
|- style="background:#fcc;"
| 7
| November 12
| @ LA Clippers
| 76–92
| Chris Paul (20)
| Tyson Chandler (13)
| Chris Paul (3)
| Staples Center  18,273
| 4–3
|- style="background:#cfc;"
| 8
| November 14
| Charlotte
| 94–85
| Peja Stojaković (42)
| Tyson Chandler (15)
| Chris Paul (10)
| Ford Center  16,623
| 5–3
|- style="background:#cfc;"
| 9
| November 15
| @ Detroit
| 100–99
| Chris Paul (20)
| Hilton Armstrong (9)
| Chris Paul (13)
| The Palace of Auburn Hills  22,076
| 6–3
|- style="background:#cfc;"
| 10
| November 15
| @ Minnesota
| 99–96
| Chris Paul (35)
| Cedric Simmons (9)
| Chris Paul (6)
| Target Center  16,151
| 7–3
|- style="background:#cfc;"
| 11
| November 21
| Miami
| 101–86
| Peja Stojaković (23)
| Tyson Chandler (15)
| Chris Paul (10)
| Ford Center  19,329
| 8–3
|- style="background:#fcc;"
| 12
| November 22
| @ Phoenix
| 83–92
| Desmond Mason (21)
| Tyson Chandler (16)
| Chris Paul (4)
| US Airways Center  18,422
| 8–4
|- style="background:#fcc;"
| 13
| November 24
| Minnesota
| 79–86
| Chris Paul (18)
| Tyson Chandler (10)
| Chris Paul (7)
| Ford Center  18,258
| 8–5
|- style="background:#fcc;"
| 14
| November 25
| @ Dallas
| 73–85
| Jannero Pargo (19)
| Hilton Armstrong (8)
| Chris Paul (4)
| American Airlines Center  20,315
| 8–6
|- style="background:#fcc;"
| 15
| November 28
| Toronto
| 77–94
| Chris Paul (16)
| Tyson Chandler (17)
| Chris Paul (11)
| Ford Center  15,647
| 8–7

|- style="background:#fcc;"
| 16
| December 1
| Chicago
| 108–111
| Rasual Butler (33)
| Tyson Chandler (17)
| Chris Paul (18)
| Ford Center  19,164
| 8–8
|- style="background:#cfc;"
| 17
| December 6
| @ LA Lakers
| 105–89
| Chris Paul (26)
| Tyson Chandler (12)
| Chris Paul (11)
| Staples Center  18,535
| 9–8
|- style="background:#fcc;"
| 18
| December 8
| @ Seattle
| 74–94
| Chris Paul (16)
| Tyson Chandler (13)
| Chris Paul (6)
| Key Arena  15,913
| 9–9
|- style="background:#fcc;"
| 19
| December 9
| @ Golden State
| 80–101
| Desmond Mason (24)
| Jannero Pargo (12)
| Jannero Pargo (8)
| Oracle Arena  17,105
| 9–10
|- style="background:#cfc;"
| 20
| December 11
| Cleveland
| 95–89
| Chris Paul (30)
| Tyson Chandler (10)
| Chris Paul (11)
| Ford Center  19,164
| 10–10
|- style="background:#fcc;"
| 21
| December 14
| San Antonio
| 77–103
| Rasual Butler (17)
| Desmond Mason (9)
| Chris Paul (12)
| New Orleans Arena  15,140
| 10–11
|- style="background:#fcc;"
| 22
| December 16
| Dallas
| 79–90
| Chris Paul (30)
| Chris Paul (12)
| Chris Paul (8)
| New Orleans Arena  16,331
| 10–12
|- style="background:#fcc;"
| 23
| December 18
| @ Miami
| 99–101
| Chris Paul (26)
| Tyson Chandler & Rasual Butler (8)
| Chris Paul (8)
| American Airlines Arena  19,600
| 10–13
|- style="background:#fcc;"
| 24
| December 20
| @ Orlando
| 83–86
| Chris Paul (19)
| Tyson Chandler (11)
| Chris Paul (10)
| Amway Arena  17,020
| 10–14
|- style="background:#cfc;"
| 25
| December 22
| Memphis
| 100–97 OT
| Marc Jackson (19)
| Tyson Chandler (17)
| Chris Paul (14)
| Ford Center  18,097
| 11–14
|- style="background:#fcc;"
| 26
| December 23
| San Antonio
| 77–112
| Chris Paul (20)
| Tyson Chandler (9)
| Chris Paul & Devin Brown (3)
| Ford Center  19,164
| 11–15
|- style="background:#fcc;"
| 27
| December 26
| @ Seattle
| 94–102
| Jannero Pargo (23)
| Tyson Chandler (11)
| Chris Paul (7)
| Key Arena  15,319
| 11–16
|- style="background:#fcc;"
| 28
| December 27
| @ Portland
| 80–101
| Desmond Mason (16)
| Desmond Mason & Tyson Chandler (7)
| Jannero Pargo (5)
| Rose Garden Arena  13,905
| 11–17
|- style="background:#cfc;"
| 29
| December 29
| Denver
| 99–89
| Rasual Butler (20)
| Devin Brown (10)
| Devin Brown (7)
| Ford Center  19,334
| 12–17
|- style="background:#fcc;"
| 30
| December 30
| @ Dallas
| 80–94
| Marc Jackson (24)
| Devin Brown (10)
| Jannero Pargo (5)
| American Airlines Center  20,433
| 12–18

|- style="background:#fcc;"
| 31
| January 2
| Golden State
| 89–97
| Rasual Butler (30)
| Tyson Chandler (15)
| Jannero Pargo (8)
| Ford Center  16,617
| 12–19
|- style="background:#fcc;"
| 32
| January 4
| Detroit
| 68–92
| Jannero Pargo (16)
| Tyson Chandler (16)
| Jannero Pargo (6)
| Ford Center  18,079
| 12–20
|- style="background:#fcc;"
| 33
| January 6
| Indiana
| 93–100
| Desmond Mason (28)
| Tyson Chandler (10)
| Jannero Pargo (6)
| Ford Center  17,422
| 12–21
|- style="background:#fcc;"
| 34
| January 8
| LA Clippers
| 90–100
| Desmond Mason (28)
| Tyson Chandler (10)
| Devin Brown (7)
| Ford Center  15,501
| 12–22
|- style="background:#cfc;"
| 35
| January 10
| @ Atlanta
| 96–77
| Jannero Pargo (24)
| Tyson Chandler (9)
| Jannero Pargo (7)
| Philips Arena  10,120
| 13–22
|- style="background:#cfc;"
| 36
| January 12
| Washington
| 104–97
| Desmond Mason (22)
| Tyson Chandler (10)
| Devin Brown (9)
| Ford Center  16,899
| 14–22
|- style="background:#cfc;"
| 37
| January 16
| Orlando
| 84–78 OT
| Jannero Pargo (25)
| Rasual Butler (11)
| Four Players (2)
| Ford Center  17,610
| 15–22
|- style="background:#fcc;"
| 38
| January 19
| @ San Antonio
| 86–99
| David West (19)
| David West (11)
| David West & Jannero Pargo (3)
| AT&T Center  17,153
| 15–23
|- style="background:#cfc;"
| 39
| January 20
| LA Lakers
| 113–103
| David West (26)
| David West (12)
| Devin Brown (6)
| Ford Center  19,329
| 16–23
|- style="background:#fcc;"
| 40
| January 23
| @ Philadelphia
| 96–102
| Devin Brown (24)
| David West (11)
| Devin Brown (4)
| Wachovia Center  12,328
| 16–24
|- style="background:#fcc;"
| 41
| January 24
| @ Toronto
| 88–90
| Rasual Butler (30)
| David West (11)
| Bobby Jackson (6)
| Air Canada Centre  14,173
| 16–25
|- style="background:#cfc;"
| 42
| January 26
| Sacramento
| 88–84
| Desmond Mason (24)
| Tyson Chandler (12)
| Bobby Jackson (7)
| New Orleans Arena  16,607
| 17–25
|- style="background:#cfc;"
| 43
| January 27
| Utah
| 94–83
| Bobby Jackson (21)
| Tyson Chandler (15)
| Devin Brown (6)
| Ford Center  18,774
| 18–25
|- style="background:#cfc;"
| 44
| January 29
| Portland
| 103–91
| David West (21)
| Tyson Chandler (16)
| David West (4)
| Ford Center  17,745
| 19–25
|- style="background:#fcc;"
| 45
| January 31
| Philadelphia
| 94–83
| Devin Brown (17)
| Tyson Chandler (15)
| Bobby Jackson (4)
| Ford Center  16,956
| 19–26

|- style="background:#cfc;"
| 46
| February 2
| @ Minnesota
| 90–83
| Chris Paul (24)
| Tyson Chandler (18)
| Chris Paul (8)
| Ford Center  18,032
| 20–26
|- style="background:#cfc;"
| 47
| February 3
| @ Houston
| 87–74
| Devin Brown (18)
| Tyson Chandler (12)
| Chris Paul (9)
| Toyota Center  18,081
| 21–26
|- style="background:#fcc;"
| 48
| February 5
| @ Sacramento
| 99–105
| Chris Paul (24)
| Tyson Chandler (13)
| Chris Paul (6)
| ARCO Arena  17,317
| 21–27
|- style="background:#cfc;"
| 49
| February 7
| @ Denver
| 114–112 OT
| Desmond Mason (23)
| Tyson Chandler (16)
| Chris Paul (7)
| Pepsi Center  15,298
| 22–27
|- style="background:#cfc;"
| 50
| February 8
| Milwaukee
| 109–101 2OT
| Desmond Mason (24)
| Tyson Chandler (22)
| Chris Paul (10)
| Ford Center  17,364
| 23–27
|- style="background:#cfc;"
| 51
| February 10
| Memphis
| 114–99
| Chris Paul (23)
| Tyson Chandler (16)
| Chris Paul (11)
| Ford Center  17,139
| 24–27
|- style="background:#fcc;"
| 52
| February 13
| @ Memphis
| 104–108
| Desmond Mason (23)
| Tyson Chandler (23)
| Chris Paul (10)
| FedEx Forum  10,641
| 24–28
|- style="background:#cfc;"
| 53
| February 14
| Sacramento
| 110–93
| Desmond Mason (18)
| Tyson Chandler (15)
| Chris Paul (6)
| Ford Center  16,753
| 25–28
|- style="background:#fcc;"
| 54
| February 20
| @ Charlotte
| 100–104
| Chris Paul (20)
| Tyson Chandler (20)
| Chris Paul (7)
| Charlotte Bobcats Arena  13,007
| 25–29
|- style="background:#cfc;"
| 55
| February 21
| @ New Jersey
| 111–107
| David West (32)
| Tyson Chandler (12)
| Chris Paul (11)
| Continental Airlines Arena  15,751
| 26–29
|- style="background:#cfc;"
| 56
| February 23
| Seattle
| 98–97
| David West (23)
| Tyson Chandler (19)
| Chris Paul (8)
| New Orleans Arena  17,961
| 27–29
|- style="background:#fcc;"
| 57
| February 27
| @ Cleveland
| 89–97
| David West (25)
| David West (10)
| David West (6)
| Quicken Loans Arena  19,619
| 27–30
|- style="background:#cfc;"
| 58
| February 28
| Atlanta
| 107–100
| Chris Paul (24)
| David West (14)
| Chris Paul (13)
| Ford Center  17,402
| 28–30

|- style="background:#fcc;"
| 59
| March 2
| @ Chicago
| 93–104
| Chris Paul (16)
| Tyson Chandler (13)
| Chris Paul (6)
| United Center  22,056
| 28–31
|- style="background:#fcc;"
| 60
| March 4
| Utah
| 94–108
| Tyson Chandler (20)
| Tyson Chandler (19)
| Chris Paul (13)
| Ford Center  17,304
| 28–32
|- style="background:#fcc;"
| 61
| March 6
| @ Denver
| 91–106
| Tyson Chandler (15)
| Tyson Chandler (18)
| Chris Paul (14)
| Pepsi Center  16,409
| 28–33
|- style="background:#fcc;"
| 62
| March 9
| @ Phoenix
| 103–104
| David West (19)
| Tyson Chandler (11)
| David West (4)
| US Airways Center  18,422
| 28–34
|- style="background:#fcc;"
| 63
| March 10
| @ Utah
| 86–96
| Jannero Pargo (15)
| David West (10)
| Chris Paul (11)
| EnergySolutions Arena  19,911
| 28–35
|- style="background:#fcc;"
| 63
| March 13
| New Jersey
| 108–112
| Chris Paul (25)
| Tyson Chandler (11)
| Chris Paul (12)
| Ford Center  16,451
| 28–36
|- style="background:#cfc;"
| 65
| March 16
| @ New York
| 92–90
| Chris Paul (20)
| David West (12)
| Chris Paul (8)
| Madison Square Garden  19,763
| 29–36
|- style="background:#fcc;"
| 66
| March 17
| @ Washington
| 103–125
| Chris Paul (21)
| Tyson Chandler (10)
| Chris Paul (8)
| Verizon Center  20,713
| 29–37
|- style="background:#cfc;"
| 67
| March 19
| Boston
| 106–88
| Rasual Butler (18)
| Tyson Chandler (11)
| Chris Paul (6)
| Ford Center  19,164
| 30–37
|- style="background:#cfc;"
| 68
| March 20
| @ Memphis
| 114–103
| David West (26)
| Tyson Chandler (11)
| Chris Paul (9)
| FedEx Forum  10,916
| 31–37
|- style="background:#fcc;"
| 69
| March 23
| LA Lakers
| 105–111
| Chris Paul (28)
| Tyson Chandler (22)
| Chris Paul (12)
| New Orleans Arena  18,535
| 31–38
|- style="background:#cfc;"
| 70
| March 25
| Houston
| 106–94
| Chris Paul (28)
| Tyson Chandler (10)
| Chris Paul (5)
| Ford Center  19,164
| 32–38
|- style="background:#fcc;"
| 71
| March 27
| Dallas
| 89–105
| Jannero Pargo (23)
| Tyson Chandler (8)
| Chris Paul (3)
| Ford Center  19,164
| 32–39
|- style="background:#fcc;"
| 72
| March 28
| @ San Antonio
| 88–92
| Chris Paul (20)
| Tyson Chandler (12)
| Chris Paul (9)
| AT&T Center  18,334
| 32–40
|- style="background:#cfc;"
| 73
| March 28
| New York
| 103–94 OT
| David West (20)
| Tyson Chandler (13)
| Chris Paul (6)
| Ford Center  18,521
| 33–40

|- style="background:#cfc;"
| 74
| April 3
| @ Milwaukee 
| 119–101
| David West (24)
| Tyson Chandler (20)
| Chris Paul (14)
| Bradley Center16,031
| 34–40
|- style="background:#cfc;"
| 75
| April 4
| Seattle 
| 101–92 OT
| David West (18)
| David West (14)
| Chris Paul (9)
| Ford Center17,021
| 35–40
|- style="background:#fcc;"
| 76
| April 6
| Phoenix 
| 95–103
| David West (17)
| Devin Brown (7)
| Devin Brown (6)
| Ford Center19,164
| 35–41
|- style="background:#cfc;"
| 77
| April 7
| @ Minnesota 
| 95–103
| Chris Paul (18)
| Marc Jackson (11)
| Chris Paul (10)
| Target Center15,907
| 36–41
|- style="background:#cfc;"
| 78
| April 10
| LA Clippers 
| 103–100 OT
| David West (33)
| Devin Brown (9)
| Chris Paul (10)
| Ford Center17,704
| 37–41
|- style="background:#fcc;"
| 79
| April 13
| Denver 
| 105–107
| David West (31)
| David West (14)
| Chris Paul (8)
| Ford Center19,164
| 37–42
|- style="background:#fcc;"
| 80
| April 14
| @ Houston 
| 112–123
| David West (33)
| Chris Paul (8)
| Chris Paul (15)
| Toyota Center18,238
| 37–43
|- style="background:#cfc;"
| 81
| April 16
| @ Sacramento 
| 125–118
| David West (25)
| Hilton Armstrong (7)
| Chris Paul (12)
| ARCO Arena17,317
| 38–43
|- style="background:#cfc;"
| 82
| April 18
| @ LA Clippers 
| 86–83
| David West (32)
| David West (9)
| Chris Paul (10)
| Staples Center18,392
| 39–43

Player statistics

Regular season 

|-
| 
| 56 || 5 || 11.3 || .544 || . || .597 || 2.7 || .2 || .2 || .5 || 3.1
|-
| 
| 21 || 3 || 7.7 || .341 || .000 || .750 || 2.0 || .1 || .1 || .1 || 2.0
|-
| 
| 58 || 49 || 28.7 || .420 || .357 || .794 || 4.3 || 2.6 || .8 || .2 || 11.6
|-
| 
| 81 || 38 || 27.4 || .398 || .369 || .644 || 3.2 || .8 || .5 || .7 || 10.1
|-
| 
| 73 || 73 || 34.6 || style=";"| .624 || .000 || .527 || style=";"| 12.4 || .9 || .5 || style=";"| 1.8 || 9.5
|-
| 
| 56 || 2 || 23.8 || .394 || .327 || .774 || 3.2 || 2.5 || .9 || .1 || 10.6
|-
| 
| 56 || 25 || 18.3 || .410 || .000 || style=";"| .874 || 3.4 || 1.0 || .4 || .1 || 7.3
|-
| 
| 54 || 0 || 13.3 || .489 || .333 || .811 || 3.0 || .3 || .6 || .3 || 4.2
|-
| 
| 75 || style=";"| 75 || 34.3 || .452 || . || .663 || 4.6 || 1.5 || .7 || .3 || 13.7
|-
| 
| style=";"| 82 || 7 || 20.9 || .409 || .388 || .852 || 2.2 || 2.5 || .6 || .0 || 9.2
|-
| 
| 64 || 64 || style=";"| 36.8 || .437 || .350 || .818 || 4.4 || style=";"| 8.9 || style=";"| 1.8 || .0 || 17.3
|-
| 
| 43 || 4 || 12.4 || .417 || . || .485 || 2.5 || .3 || .2 || .5 || 2.9
|-
| 
| 13 || 13 || 32.7 || .423 || .405 || .816 || 4.2 || .8 || .6 || .3 || 17.8
|-
| 
| 13 || 0 || 7.9 || .467 || style=";"| .429 || .714 || .8 || .4 || .2 || .1 || 1.7
|-
| 
| 52 || 52 || 36.5 || .476 || .320 || .824 || 8.2 || 2.2 || .8 || .7 || style=";"| 18.3
|}

Awards and records

Transactions

References

New Orleans Hornets seasons